The following is a list of notable former pupils of the Royal High School of Edinburgh, Scotland.

Although the Royal High School long enjoyed a near monopoly on boys' education among the Edinburgh burgesses and county gentry, roll lists before the mid eighteenth century are incomplete. Consequently, attendance by the mathematician John Napier (1550–1617) and the philosopher David Hume (1711–1776) is unconfirmed and may be legend.

On occasion the school has also provided a literally royal education. In 1859 The Prince of Wales received lessons in Roman history from the Rector, Dr. Leonhard Schmitz, and presented the Carson medal at the prize-giving. The following year, 1860, Prince Ferdinand d'Orléans, duke of Alençon (1844–1910), Louis d'Orléans, prince of Condé (1845–1866), and Prince Pierre d'Orléans, duke of Penthièvre (1845–1919), attended classes and were awarded prizes.

Military and civil honours 

First World War

Schoolfellows who gave their lives for their country are commemorated by the memorial porch and brass tablets in the school hall.  The upper architrave of the marble Doric portico is inscribed with a phrase from Simonides: ΟΥΔΕ ΤΕΘΝΑΣΙ ΘΑΝΟΝΤΕΣ.  They died but are not dead.

A memorial field was laid out at Jock's Lodge in 1919, where a grand pavilion was presented to the school by the Education Authority and opened by Prince Henry in 1925. The perimeter was planted with commemorative trees and a stand was erected by public subscription. The memorial gates, opened in 1950, bear copper shields emblematic of the fighting services. Their vine motif is the Christian symbol of life. Set above is the word Meminerimus (Let us remember), taken from the school song.

The Roll of Honour 1914–1918 contains 1024 names. The number of those who fell is 180. Former pupils received many decorations and awards, among them:

The VC recipients were Philip Bent and Harcus Strachan.

Second World War

In 1949 memorial windows in the school hall were dedicated to the dead of the Second World War. Made with stained glass, they were the work of former pupils William Wilson and William G. Dey. Their theme is Scottish heritage. The west window is called the Heroes Window. It carries the school crest and military insignia of former pupils, and features famous warriors. The centre window is called the Royal Window. It depicts royal patrons of the school and symbols of constitutional and technological evolution. Beneath the arms of Scotland is Barbour's line: 'Fredom is ane nobil thing'. The east window is called the Thinkers Window. It displays the city arms and portrays poets and visionaries of Scotland. The lower corner panels of each window show a child training to maintain the national inheritance.

The Roll of Honour 1939–1945 contains 1243 names. The number of those who fell is 131. The following are among the decorations and awards:

The VC recipient is John Cruickshank. The GC recipient (posthumous) was Douglas Ford.

References 

 
Lists of Scottish people by school affiliation
Edinburgh-related lists